The Splendid Road is a 1925 American historical drama film directed by Frank Lloyd and starring Anna Q. Nilsson, Robert Frazer, and Lionel Barrymore.  Based upon the novel of the same name by Vingie E. Roe, the film is set during the 1849 California Gold Rush.

Plot
As described in a review in a film magazine, one of the passengers on a ship sailing from Boston around Cape Horn to California is an adventurous young woman, Sandra (Nilsson). A widow dies, her little girl appeals to Sandra. Rather than split the little family, Sandra adopts all three children, and decides to remain in Sacramento and make a home for them. Chance causes Stanton Halliday (Frazer), an agent for John Grey (Davis), a capitalist, to come to her rescue and they are attracted to each other. Doctor Bidwell (Earle) loves the capitalist's daughter Lillian (Day) but, believing she loves Halliday, he persuades Sandra that she must give him up or ruin his career. Halliday is ordered to evict Sandra who is a squatter, but he refuses and goes to her rescue. Halliday is shot by Dan Chehollis (Barrymore), a gambler who seeks to force his attentions on Sandra. While convalescing, he learns of Bidwell's action and goes back to Sandra, arriving in time to take her and her family away to safety after a wild wagon ride, as floods have caused the levee to burst and the town is flooded.

Cast

Preservation
With no copies of The Splendid Road located in any film archives, it is a lost film.

See also
Lionel Barrymore filmography

References

Bibliography
 Goble, Alan (1999). The Complete Index to Literary Sources in Film. Walter de Gruyter.

External links

1925 films
1925 lost films
1920s historical drama films
1920s color films
American historical drama films
Lost drama films
Films directed by Frank Lloyd
American silent feature films
Films set in 1849
First National Pictures films
American black-and-white films
Lost American films
Films about the California Gold Rush
1925 drama films
1920s English-language films
1920s American films
Silent American drama films